Semen Vladimirovich Makovich (born 13 July 1995) is a Russian swimmer. He competed in the men's 200 metre individual medley event at the 2016 Summer Olympics.

References

External links
 

1995 births
Living people
Russian male swimmers
Olympic swimmers of Russia
Swimmers at the 2016 Summer Olympics
Place of birth missing (living people)
Male medley swimmers
Russian male freestyle swimmers